Brownhill is a surname. Notable people with the surname include:

David Brownhill (born 1935), Australian politician
Josh Brownhill (born 1995), English footballer
Thomas Brownhill (1838–1915), English cricketer
Thomas Robson Brownhill (1821–1864), English comedian and actor
Adam Brownhill (born 1974), Inventor